Blake Campbell (born 7 August 1982) is a former Australian rules footballer who played with Carlton in the Australian Football League.

He is the son of Des Campbell and brother of Brad Campbell, both of whom played for Melbourne.

Sources
Holmesby, Russell & Main, Jim (2009). The Encyclopedia of AFL Footballers. 8th ed. Melbourne: Bas Publishing.

Carlton Football Club players
Living people
1982 births
Australian rules footballers from Victoria (Australia)
Murray Bushrangers players
Tongala Football Club players